Brazil Township is one of eleven townships in Clay County, Indiana. As of the 2010 census, its population was 8,471 and it contained 3,806 housing units.

History
Brazil Township was organized in 1868.

Geography

Cities and towns
 Brazil (the county seat) (north three-quarters)

Unincorporated towns
 Donaldsonville
 Shady Lane
(This list is based on USGS data and may include former settlements.)

Adjacent townships
 Van Buren Township (northeast)
 Jackson Township (southeast)
 Posey Township (southwest)
 Dick Johnson Township (northwest)

Major highways
  U.S. Route 40
  State Road 59
  State Road 340

Cemeteries
The township contains 4 cemeteries: Old Hill, Stunkard, Otter Creek and Restlawn.

References
 
 United States Census Bureau cartographic boundary files

Townships in Clay County, Indiana
Terre Haute metropolitan area
Townships in Indiana
1868 establishments in Indiana
Populated places established in 1868